Mark A. Clark (born March 8, 1967, in San Manuel, Arizona) is a member of the Democratic Party.

He was a state representative in the Arizona House of Representatives' 45th Legislature (District 07) from 2001 to 2002.  His father, Harry Clark, was a state representative from 1992 to 2000.

In 2003, Republican Jim Waring became representative of District 07.

References

 Arizona Department of Game and Fish

1967 births
Living people
People from Pinal County, Arizona
Members of the Arizona House of Representatives
21st-century American politicians